Kiril Grozdanov (born 27 September 1997) is a Bulgarian footballer who plays as a forward for Bulgarian Second League club Septemvri Simitli.

Club career

Pirin Blagoevgrad
On 26 July 2016, Grozdanov signed his first professional contract with Pirin Blagoevgrad. On 31 August 2017, he was sent on a season-long loan at Second League club Sozopol.

References

External links

1997 births
Living people
Bulgarian footballers
Bulgaria under-21 international footballers
First Professional Football League (Bulgaria) players
Second Professional Football League (Bulgaria) players
OFC Pirin Blagoevgrad players
FC Sozopol players
Association football forwards
Sportspeople from Blagoevgrad